Navajo Braille is the braille alphabet of the Navajo language. It uses a subset of the letters of Unified English Braille, along with the punctuation and formatting of that standard. There are no contractions. 

In numerical order by decade, the letters are:

The alphabet was created by Carol Begay Green and adopted by the Navajo Nation in 2015.

References

French-ordered braille alphabets
Navajo language